Avery Hill is an area of South East London mainly within Royal Borough of Greenwich, and with some parts in the London Borough of Bexley. It is located east of Eltham and north west of Sidcup. It is believed that the area is named after an aviary formerly located in the area.

Avery Hill House
Avery Hill House was a palatial dwelling built by John Thomas North who had made his fortune in the sodium nitrate trade in Chile.

Following North's death the house was acquired by the London County Council in July 1902 and its grounds extended to create Avery Hill Park in 1903. In 1906 North's house became Avery Hill College of Education, later incorporating two neighbouring buildings. Within a year of its foundation, the residential college had become the largest of LCC's training colleges and was frequently oversubscribed; in 79 years it trained over 15,000 teachers. In 1985 the college merged with Thames Polytechnic, renamed the University of Greenwich in 1993; the university also has extensive facilities at the nearby Southwood site.

The university planned to move out of the Mansion site in summer 2020. A Harris Academy boys secondary school is planned to open in 2022.

Winter Garden

The house is notable for an indoor winter garden, the second largest Victorian glasshouse in the UK after Kew Gardens' Temperate House. It forms part of one of the most extensive and expensive garden arrangements ever constructed as part of a private house in England. In the early 21st century, the Winter Garden had fallen into neglect. A campaign aimed to restore the Winter Garden and protect the heritage of the Mansion, making it open to the public.

Avery Hill Park

Avery Hill Park is a public park. Since 2010, the park has hosted a Parkrun on Saturdays.

Transport

Rail
The closest National Rail stations to Avery Hill are Falconwood and New Eltham.

Buses
Avery Hill is served by the following TFL bus routes.
132 to Bexleyheath via Blackfen, Blendon & Bexley or to North Greenwich via Eltham & Kidbrooke 
162 to Beckenham via New Eltham, Chislehurst, Bickley, Bromley & Park Langley or to Eltham
286 to Greenwich via Eltham, Kidbrooke, Blackheath & Westcombe Park or to Sidcup
B13 to Bexleyheath via Blackfen & Blendon or to New Eltham
B15 to Bexleyheath via Falconwood & Welling or to Horn Park via Eltham
N21 to Bexleyheath via Blackfen, Blendon & Bexley or to Trafalgar Square via Eltham, Lee, Lewisham, New Cross, Old Kent Road, London Bridge & Cannon Street. Night service.

Nearby areas
Avery Hill borders Falconwood to the north and north east, Blackfen to the east, Sidcup to the south east, New Eltham to the south and south west and Eltham to the west and north west.

References

External links
Friends of Avery Hill Park
Avery Hill Winter Garden
Save and renovate Avery Hill Winter Garden campaign

Districts of the Royal Borough of Greenwich
Areas of London
Eltham